Eggs Benedict is a common American breakfast or brunch dish, consisting of two halves of an English muffin, each topped with Canadian bacon, a poached egg, and hollandaise sauce. It was popularized in New York City.

Origin and history 
There are conflicting accounts as to the origin of eggs Benedict.

Delmonico's in Lower Manhattan says on its menu that "Eggs Benedict was first created in our ovens in 1860." One of its former chefs, Charles Ranhofer, also published the recipe for Eggs à la Benedick in 1894.

In an interview recorded in the "Talk of the Town" column of The New Yorker in 1942, the year before his death, Lemuel Benedict, a retired Wall Street stock broker, said that he had wandered into the Waldorf Hotel in 1894 and, hoping to find a cure for his morning hangover, ordered "buttered toast, poached eggs, crisp bacon, and a hooker of hollandaise". Oscar Tschirky, the maître d'hôtel, was so impressed with the dish that he put it on the breakfast and luncheon menus but substituted ham for the bacon and a toasted English muffin for the toast.

A later claim to the creation of eggs Benedict was circuitously made by Edward P. Montgomery on behalf of Commodore E. C. Benedict. In 1967 Montgomery wrote a letter to then The New York Times food columnist Craig Claiborne, which included a recipe he said he had received through his uncle, a friend of the commodore. Commodore Benedict's recipe—by way of Montgomery—varies greatly from Ranhofer's version, particularly in the hollandaise sauce preparation—calling for the addition of a "hot, hard-cooked egg and ham mixture".

Variations

Many variations of Eggs Benedict exist, involving replacing any component except the egg:
 Avocado Toast Eggs Benedict – substitutes toast in place of the muffin and adds sliced avocado.
 California Eggs Benedict – adds sliced Hass avocado. Variations may include sliced tomato instead of Canadian bacon.
 Eggs Atlantic – substitutes salmon which may be smoked, in place of Canadian bacon.
 Eggs Balmoral – substitutes haggis in place of Canadian bacon.
 Eggs Blackstone – substitutes streaky bacon in place of Canadian bacon and adds a tomato slice.
 Eggs Blanchard – substitutes béchamel sauce in place of Hollandaise.
 Eggs Chesapeake (Crab Eggs Benedict, Crab Cakes Benedict) – substitutes a Maryland blue crab cake in place of Canadian bacon.
 Eggs Cochon (Eggs Cochon de Lait) – substitutes pork "debris" (slow roasted pork shredded in its own juices) in place of Canadian bacon, buttermilk biscuit in place of the English muffin. Served in New Orleans restaurants.
 Eggs Florentine – adds spinach, sometimes substituted in place of the Canadian bacon. Older versions of eggs Florentine add spinach to poached or shirred eggs.
 Eggs Hebridean – a Scottish variety, substitutes Black pudding in place of the Canadian bacon.
 Eggs Hussarde – substitutes Holland rusks in place of the English muffin and adds Bordelaise sauce.
 Eggs Mornay – substitutes Mornay sauce in place of the Hollandaise.
Eggs Neptune – substitutes crab meat in place of Canadian bacon.
 Eggs Omar (Steak Benedict) substitutes a small steak in place of Canadian bacon and sometimes replaces the Hollandaise with béarnaise.
Eggs Trivette – adds Creole mustard to the Hollandaise and a topping of crayfish.
 Eggs Woodhouse – includes two eggs and artichoke hearts, creamed spinach, bechamel sauce, Iberico ham, black truffle and beluga caviar. The recipe is featured in the book How To Archer, inspired by the television series Archer on FXX.
 Eggs Zenedict – adds toasted scone and peameal bacon smothered in sundried tomato Hollandaise. A specialty of restaurants in the defunct Canadian retail chain Zellers.
 Huevos Benedictos – adds sliced avocado or Mexican chorizo, topped with salsa (such as salsa roja or salsa brava) and Hollandaise sauce.
 Irish Benedict – substitutes corned beef or Irish bacon in place of Canadian bacon.
 New Jersey Benedict – substitutes Taylor pork roll in place of Canadian bacon.

See also

 List of breakfast foods
 List of brunch foods
 List of egg dishes
 List of foods named after people
 List of regional dishes of the United States

Footnotes

References

External links

“Was He the Eggman?” An account in The New York Times about Lemuel Benedict and the efforts of Jack Benedict, the son of Lemuel's first cousin, to promote Lemuel's story. Article includes link to an audio slide show.

Egg dishes
American breakfast foods
American cuisine